Matti Klinga (born 10 December 1994) is a Finnish footballer currently playing for FC Lahti.

Career
Klinga is a youth prospect of Reipas Lahti. As a youth player, Klinga has also played for HIFK Fotboll and Pallokerho-35. 

Klinga made his professional debut in a match against Porin Palloilijat in Ykkönen on 30 May 2011. After signing for FC Lahti, he played three seasons for the team and signed for HJK Helsinki in the season 2015 . In March 2016, Klinga signed a contract with SJK Seinäjoki.

Return to FC Lahti
Klinga returned to FC Lahti for the 2019 season.

References

External links
FC Lahti Profile

1994 births
Living people
Finnish footballers
Finland youth international footballers
FC Lahti players
Veikkausliiga players
Place of birth missing (living people)
Association football midfielders